The 1910 Argentine Primera División was the 19th season of top-flight football in Argentina. The season began on April 24 and ended in December. The championship was reduced from 10 to 9 teams, with each team playing the other twice.

Gimnasia y Esgrima de Buenos Aires (promoted last year) made its debut at the top division while Argentino de Quilmes was relegated to  Segunda División.

Alumni won its 9th title in 11 seasons.

Final table

References

Argentine Primera División seasons
1910 in Argentine football
1910 in South American football